Lyme Regis Philpot Museum is situated in the town of Lyme Regis on the Jurassic Coast in Dorset, England. It is a registered charity under English law. It is built on the site of the former home of the palaeontologist Mary Anning.

The museum building was commissioned in 1901 by Thomas Philpot, a relative of the Philpot sisters, fossil collectors and friends of Anning  and build in 1902 by architect George Vialls, who also designed the nearby Guildhall (now the Town Hall).

The collections and subject areas exhibited include fossils from the surrounding area dating from the Jurassic period, geology, local maritime history, memorabilia, and writers associated with the town such as Jane Austen and John Fowles. An ornate example of Coade stone work, in the form of ammonites is set into the pavement outside the museum, reflecting both local history (specifically Eleanor Coade, the inventor of Coade stone) and the palaeontology for which Lyme Regis is well known.

See also
 Dinosaurland Fossil Museum

References

External links 
 Lyme Regis Museum website

Cultural infrastructure completed in 1901
Museums in Lyme Regis
Local museums in Dorset
Geology museums in England
Fossil museums
Jurassic Coast
Buildings and structures in Lyme Regis
Paleontology in the United Kingdom
Charities based in England